Erika Naddei (born 1 April 1993) is an Australian actress and musical theatre performer who is best known for her role as Ado Annie in the Harvest Rain Theatre Company production of Oklahoma! at the Queensland Performing Arts Centre and Veronica Sawyer in the Millennial Productions production of Heathers the Musical.

Erika graduated from the Brisbane Academy of Musical Theatre in 2012. She also graduated with a Diploma in Music Theatre and Commercial Dance from the Australian Dance Performance Institute in 2014.

Recent news

October 2011, Starring as Charity Hope Valentine in Sweet Charity.

2012, Originating the role of the Childlike Empress in the world premiere stage adaption of The Neverending Story

March 2013, Starring in Tell Me on a Sunday, a one-woman show by Andrew Lloyd Webber

April 2013, Performing as Ado Annie in the 70th Anniversary production of Oklahoma! starring Ian Stenlake, Val Lehman and Steven Tandy.

2014, Performing as Kelly in new short play 'Speaking Freely' by Jack Kelly at Anywhere Theatre Festival.

2014, Performing as Marta in Company (musical) at the La Boîte Roundhouse Theatre.

January 2015, Performing in the Oscar Theatre Company production of Boy&Girl 2: Mercury Rising at the Brisbane Powerhouse

Live performances

References

Australian stage actresses
1993 births
Living people
Actresses from Brisbane